Citharognathus is a genus of Asian tarantulas that was first described by Reginald Innes Pocock in 1895.  it contains two species: C. hosei and C. tongmianensis.

Diagnosis 
They can be distinguished by their clypeus, which is less than the with of the eye group. The leg 4 is also distinctly thicker and longer than leg 1.

See also
 List of Theraphosidae species

References

Theraphosidae genera
Spiders of Asia
Taxa named by R. I. Pocock
Theraphosidae